This article shows the rosters of all participating teams at the men's goalball tournament at the 2016 Summer Paralympics in Rio de Janeiro.

Group A

The following is the Algeria roster in the men's goalball tournament of the 2016 Summer Paralympics.

The following is the Brazil roster in the men's goalball tournament of the 2016 Summer Paralympics.

The following is the Canada roster in the men's goalball tournament of the 2016 Summer Paralympics.

The following is the Germany roster in the men's goalball tournament of the 2016 Summer Paralympics.

The following is the Sweden roster in the men's goalball tournament of the 2016 Summer Paralympics.

Group B

The following is the China roster in the men's goalball tournament of the 2016 Summer Paralympics.

The following is the Finland roster in the men's goalball tournament of the 2016 Summer Paralympics.

The following is the Lithuania roster in the men's goalball tournament of the 2016 Summer Paralympics.

The following is the Turkey roster in the men's goalball tournament of the 2016 Summer Paralympics.

The following is the United States roster in the men's goalball tournament of the 2016 Summer Paralympics.

See also
Goalball at the 2016 Summer Paralympics – Women's team rosters

References

2
Men's team rosters